This article lists the presidents of Guinea-Bissau, since the establishment of the office of president in 1973.

List of officeholders
Political parties

Other factions

Symbols

Notes

Timeline

Latest election

See also

 Politics of Guinea-Bissau
 List of captains-major of Bissau
 List of captains-major of Cacheu
 List of governors of Portuguese Guinea
 List of prime ministers of Guinea-Bissau
 Vice President of Guinea-Bissau

References

External links
 World Statesmen – Guinea-Bissau

Government of Guinea-Bissau

Guinea-Bissau
Guinea-Bissau politics-related lists